Sukrutha Wagle  is an Indian actress and model who works in Kannada film industry and Telugu film industry. She made her debut with the state award-winning film Jatta in 2014 under "Omkar Movies".

Personal  life
Born in Manipal, Karnataka, Sukrutha is daughter of Smitha and Sadananda Wagle. She has a sister. She pursued Bachelor of Science in Hospitality & Catering Management from Pondicherry. Further, after pursuing Master of Science she completed  Bachelor of Laws from Vaikunta Baliga College of Law. She also holds Diploma in Business Administration and Diploma in Aviation Hospitality.

Career
Wagle started her career as a model and a photographer. Manager Kumar Jagannath introduced her to the director B. M. Giriraj, who directed of her debut film Jatta. The movie won best film award at Karnataka State Film Awards. She also won best actress award at Chitrasanthe Awards.

Her next film was a love story by director Suni. She plays the daughter of Srinagar Kitty in the film Bahuparaak. She acted in Kiragoorina Gayyaligalu, directed by Sumana Kittur. It was a famous novel based film written by Poornachandra Tejaswi.

In the film is Megha Alias Maggi she plays the role of a sadistic, tomboy villain. She is also playing a role of documentary filmmaker in the movie Dayavittu Gamanisi as directed by Rohit Padaki. Wagle was also a wild card contestant in the Kannada reality show Bigg Boss Kannada 4. She is also the brand ambassador for KSIC Mysore silk saree for their 100th anniversary.

Reality Shows

Filmography

References

External links
 

Actresses in Kannada cinema
Indian film actresses
21st-century Indian actresses
Actresses from Bangalore
Living people
Kannada actresses
Bigg Boss Kannada contestants
1994 births